"Grown-Up Christmas List" (sometimes titled "My Grown-Up Christmas List") is a Christmas song written by David Foster (music) and Linda Thompson-Jenner (lyrics). Originally written by Foster for the 1989 CBC Christmas program "A David Foster Christmas Card", the song was recorded as a duet with David Foster and Natalie Cole. In 1990, a Natalie-only version of the song appeared on David Foster's "River of Love" album. The song was planned to be released as a single, but only a very small number of copies were sold in a limited region. In 1992, Amy Grant recorded the first cover version of the song for her second Christmas album "Home for Christmas". (As a special note, she added lyrics that can only be heard on this version.) This was the beginning of a series of cover versions by many artists, and it has become a standard Christmas song in the 21st century. It is one of David Foster's most widely sung songs.

Amy Grant version

Personnel 
 Amy Grant – lead vocals
 Robbie Buchanan – keyboards
 Tom Hemby – guitar
 Ronn Huff – conductor
 Alan Moore – orchestration
 The London Studio Orchestra – strings
 Nat Peck – contractor

Single CD track listing 
 "Grown Up Christmas List" (edit) - 3:44
 "Grown Up Christmas List" (LP version) - 5:00

Music video 
A&M Records released a music video for Amy Grant's recording of the song, featuring an appearance by Grant's son, Matthew Chapman. The song's edited version was used in the video.

Chart 
The original version of Grant's single did not enter any of the Billboard charts until 2011. Since then, it has spent 30 weeks on the Christian Digital Songs chart, peaking at No. 11 in December 2017. Kelly Clarkson's version entered the Adult Contemporary chart in 2003 where it spent five weeks.

Kelly Clarkson version

Amy Grant version

Other recordings

References 

1990s ballads
Amy Grant songs
American Christmas songs
1990 singles
1990 songs
1992 singles
2003 singles
A&M Records singles
Kelly Clarkson songs
Luis Miguel songs
Pop ballads
Rissi Palmer songs
Songs written by Amy Grant
Songs written by David Foster
Songs written by Linda Thompson (actress)